, also known by the nickname , is a Japanese singer and actress born 26 May 1968 in Yokohama, Kanagawa Prefecture, Japan. Iwai was a member of the all-girl pop group Onyanko Club (from 21 June 1985 until 31 August 1987), and she was the shortest of all the members at 150 centimetres (4 ft 11 in). She was also half of the pop group Ushiroyubi Sasaregumi, a spin-off group of Onyanko Club. She has an older sister, Akiko, who is four years older than her and is said to look just like her.

Biography
She moved to Funabashi, Chiba Prefecture after her parents divorced when she was younger.

On 21 June 1985, she became the 19th member of Onyanko Club after auditioning on the TV program Yūyake Nyan Nyan, and she appeared on the cover of their first album, Kick Off. Shortly afterward, she and Mamiko Takai, also a member of Onyanko Club, formed the group Ushiroyubi Sasaregumi. She has been called by the nickname "Yūyu" since she was a little girl, and she was also called by that name on the program. Yukiko Iwai performed the lead vocals for Onyanko Club's fifth single, Osaki ni Shitsurei, released in July 1986. From that point, she became the main vocalist for the majority of their albums, and was considered central to the success of the group.

She made her solo debut with the single Angel Bodyguard(天使のボディーガード, Tenshi no Bodīgādo) on 25 March 1987. In April of that same year, Ushiroyubi Sasaregumi was disbanded because Takai graduated from Onyanko Club and moved on to other things. It was said that she and Takai did not get along, which she subsequently admitted on a TV program. Iwai felt that Takai was privileged by Yasushi Akimoto, a lyricist and broadcast writer at the time, which was also not amusing to her. The person she was closest to in Onyanko Club was Minayo Watanabe, who was a year younger than her, and Iwai claimed that unlike the other members, she treated even the younger members as equals. Onyanko Club itself disbanded in August later that year, and Iwai began working for Watanabe Productions (Nabe Pro) along with fellow Onyanko Club member Sonoko Kawai. She also began working under her nickname "Yūyu", turning it into a stage name.

Immediately after Yukiko Iwai turned solo, it became an "winter era of idols" in a reaction to the boom of Onyanko Club, and she retired from singer activity with  issued in February 1989. In 1994, she changed her stage name back to her real name "Yukiko Iwai", but by this time her activity was sluggish. 

In 1997, she married a businessman after she split with entertainer Hideyuki Nakayama, with whom she had been dating for many years. At this time, she refused to hold a press conference with the media, saying she had nothing else to say. Then, she virtually retired from the entertainment industry. Note that she expressed her admiration for DINK after Takai's marriage and stated that she loathed children. However, she had two children after her marriage. In 2002, she participated in the reunion event of Onyanko Club. Since then, however, she has not been seen in public.

Discography
Singles

1987.03.25 : Angel Bodyguard(天使のボディーガード, Tenshi no Bodīgādo) (with Onyanko Club)
1987.07.22 : 
1987.10.28 : 
1988.01.21 : 
1988.04.21 : 
1988.07.27 : 
1988.11.30 : 
1989.02.08 : 
 The opening theme of "the Adventures of Peter Pan". The coupling song  is the ending theme of "the Adventures of Peter Pan".

Albums

1987.07.29 : 
1987.12.16 : 
1988.07.21 : 
1988.07.21 : 

Compilations

1989.03.21 : 
2002.02.20 : 
2007.08.17 :

Appearance on TV
 Variety shows
  (from October 1987 to September 1988)
  (from October 1988 to September 1994)

 Anime
 High School! Kimengumi (from October 1985 to September 1987)
 As the spin-off group Ushiroyubi Sasaregumi.
 The Adventures of Peter Pan (from January 1989 to December 1989)
 As the singer of theme songs.

Videos

Further reading

Video games
Yūyu no Quiz de Go! Go! (Taito arcade game released in 1991, ported for the Super Famicom in 1992)

External links
 Yukiko Iwai on Idollica 
ゆうゆのランド (Tribute Blog in Japanese)

References

 
 

Onyanko Club
Pony Canyon artists
1968 births
Japanese idols
Japanese women pop singers
Actresses from Yokohama
Living people
Musicians from Kanagawa Prefecture